The 2019–20 Belgian First Division A (officially known as Jupiler Pro League) was the 117th season of top-tier football in Belgium.

On 2 April 2020, the Jupiler Pro League's board of directors agreed to propose to cancel the season early during the COVID-19 pandemic. Should this proposal be accepted, Club Brugge will be awarded the title. In the meantime UEFA has threatened to ban teams in Europe in case their respective leagues were terminated early without trying to have all remaining matches completed. The decision of whether to accept this proposal was initially meant to be decided by a vote at a meeting on 15 April 2020, but had been postponed three times.

The proposal was finally accepted by the General Assembly on 15 May 2020, confirming Club Brugge as 2019–20 First Division A champions.

Team changes
As 2018–19 Belgian First Division B champions, Mechelen would have replaced relegated Lokeren. However, as part of the 2017–19 Belgian football fraud scandal, Mechelen were found guilty of match-fixing at the end of the 2017–18 season, resulting in the club being relegated back to the First Division B and runners-up Beerschot taking the spot of Mechelen instead. Mechelen appealed the decision with the Belgian Court of Arbitration for Sports, which confirmed that KV Mechelen was indeed guilty of match-fixing, but that according to the rules of the Royal Belgian Football Association, relegation is no longer a possible penalty as the match-fixing occurred more than one season ago. KV Mechelen was thus allowed to play in the Belgian First Division A, but did get banned from participating in the UEFA Europa League and the Belgian Cup for one season.

Format change
While the regular season remains unchanged, the end of season play-offs have been altered somewhat, specifically the Europa League play-offs will now be played by 16 instead of 12 teams. Taking part will be the bottom ten teams together with the six top teams from the Belgian First Division B, to be divided in four groups of four teams. The four group winners will play semi-finals and a final to determine the team which will play the fourth (or fifth) placed team from the championship play-offs for the remaining ticket into the UEFA Europa League. This change allows both the team relegating from the 2019–20 Belgian First Division A and the 2019–20 Belgian First Division B champion to take part in the Europa League play-offs, allowing these teams to bridge the gap of nearly six months without any matches as used to be the case in previous seasons.

Teams

Stadiums and locations

Personnel and kits

Managerial changes

Regular season

League table

Results

Season statistics

Top scorers

Clean sheets

Top assists

Notes

References

2019-20
2019–20 in European association football leagues
1
Belgium